Ducan's Marsh is a  biological Site of Special Scientific Interest north-east of Loddon in Norfolk. It is part of the Broadland Ramsar site and Special Protection Area, and The Broads Special Area of Conservation.

This unimproved area of wet grassland is in the valley of Carleton Beck, a small tributary of the River Yare. There are species rich fen and fen grassland communities in areas around springs on the side of the valley. The grassland is maintained by light summer grazing and it has a number of uncommon plants.

The site is private land with no public access.

References

Sites of Special Scientific Interest in Norfolk
Ramsar sites in England
Special Protection Areas in England
Special Areas of Conservation in England